Rajendra biguttata is a moth in the family Erebidae. It was described by Francis Walker in 1855. It is found from southern India to north-eastern India and in Bangladesh and Sri Lanka.

Description
Head and thorax are black. Vertex of the head with a white band. Abdomen crimson dorsally and black ventrally with a series of short dorsal black bands. The species has white fascia on the forewing which is broader and elbowed at vein 2 which runs from base to the apex. Hindwings crimson with black cilia. In Sri Lankan subspecies, cilia are whitish.

Subspecies
Rajendra biguttata biguttata
Rajendra biguttata irregularis (Moore, 1882) (Sri Lanka)

References

Moths described in 1855
Spilosomina